Kamleshwar may refer to:
Kamleshwar (writer)
Kamleshwar Dam
Kamleshwar Patel